Widmerpool was a railway station serving  Widmerpool in the English county of Nottinghamshire. It was situated on the Nottingham direct line of the Midland Railway between London and Nottingham via Corby.

History 
The station was opened for goods (1 Nov 1879)  & passengers (2 February 1880)   by the Midland Railway. The station was designed by the Midland Railway company architect John Holloway Sanders.

It also improved access to and from the iron-ore fields in Leicestershire and Rutland.

Local traffic was always minimal, a situation not helped by the station being situated one and a half miles from the village of its name, and it closed to passengers as early as 1949.

According to the Official Handbook of Stations the following classes of traffic were being handled at this station in 1956: G, P†, F, L, H, C and there was a 1-ton 10 cwt crane.

Stationmasters

Thomas Sanders 1879 - 1883
G. Lamberts 1884 - 1888 (afterwards station master at Whitacre)
James Brindley 1888
William Henry Higginson 1888 - 1890 (afterwards station master at Fiskerton)
William H. Turner 1890 - 1893 (afterwards station master at Carlton)
Samuel Oughton 1893 - 1895 (formerly station master at Edwalton, afterwards station master at Whitwell)
John Thomas Tye 1895 - 1903
George Edward Cramp 1903 - 1916 (formerly station master at Hykeham, afterwards district station master in Nigeria)
Harry Horbutt Russell 1918 - 1921
Thomas Alfred Mason 1922 - 1937
Harold Crompton 1937 - 1939 (also station master at Upper Broughton, afterwards station master at Ipstones, Bradnop and Winkhill)
William Simmonds from 1939
Arnold Naylor
Frank W.E. Clarke 1945 - 1947 (afterwards station master at Rolleston Junction)
E.J. Bloor 1947 (formerly station master at Westhouses)
John Abel 1947
George Jones 1948 - 1956
Fred Saunders 1958 - 1960

Present day 
This was used initially for the Advanced Passenger Train project and, more recently, Class 390 Pendolino units. It was also used for testing London Underground 'S Stock' trains.

The station's Up platform remains in existence, as does the Down platform waiting room although the platform itself was removed during electrification work in 2000. The main station building was converted into a pub and restaurant c1966 before the line closed. It was originally called the Schooner Inn and later the Pullman Inn. Following closure of the business, Network Rail purchased the building and surrounding land in order to secure access to the test track infrastructure. The building was unused from 2016 to 2022.

The buildings were demolished in August 2022.

The timber goods shed survived until electrification in 2000.  Just to the north of the station site lies Stanton Tunnel, long.

References

External links
 Pictures of Widmerpool station over the years
 Pictures of trains at Widmerpool station
 Widmerpool station on navigable 1946 O.S. map

Disused railway stations in Nottinghamshire
Railway stations in Great Britain opened in 1880
Railway stations in Great Britain closed in 1949
Former Midland Railway stations
John Holloway Sanders railway stations